Ardugah Shahid Matehri (also Romanized as Ārdūgāh Shahīd Maṭehrī; also known as Ardugah Pīshāhang) is a village in Qasabeh-ye Gharbi Rural District, in the Central District of Sabzevar County, Razavi Khorasan Province, Iran. At the 2006 census, its population was 14, in 4 families.

See also 

 List of cities, towns and villages in Razavi Khorasan Province

References 

Populated places in Sabzevar County